Francesco Blasi (born 18 November 1959) is an Italian Medical scientist and professor. His domain of research is respiratory medicine. He has been the president of European Respiratory Society (ERS) during 2012–13. He has served as the president of Italian Respiratory Society during 2015–17. He is presently serving as one of the board of directors of University of Milan and is the professor of respiratory medicine in department pathophysiology and transplantation in University of Milan.

Early life and education 
Blasi received the MD degree from University of Milan in 1984. He carried out specialization in Cardiology and Respiratory Diseases from the same University during 1987 and 1997 respectively. He carried out his PhD in Respiratory Diseases from the University of Milan in 1991.

Research area 
Blasi is known for his work in the domain of immunology, bronchitis, pneumonia, cystic fibrosis, COPD, tuberculosis, lung transplantation etc. His research area includes the effects of atypical bacterial infection in the immunity at cellular level in the chronic case of bronchitis. He also known for working on the effects of antibiotics on Chronic obstructive pulmonary disease (COPD) and the for finding the roles of viral infection and atypical bacteria in the case of asthma onset.

Associations 
Blasi has been nominated as the chair of scientific committee of World Bronchiectasis Conference in 2017. He has been the founder member of European Registry of Bronchiectasis (EMBARC), Italian Bronchiectasis Registry (IRIDE) and  Italian NTM Registry. He has served as head of cardiothoratic unit (IRCCS) at Policlinico of Milan. He has been the vice-president of European Respiratory Society (ERS) till 2011 and served as president during 2012–13. He has served as the president of Italian Respiratory Society during 2015–17. Besides being the professor of respiratory medicine, he is also a board of directors of University of Milan.

Books authored

Bibliography

Notable publications 

 Guidelines for the management of adult lower respiratory tract infections, 2011, https://doi.org/10.1111/j.1469-0691.2011.03672.x

Additional sources 

 Annesi-Maesano, Isabella. Respiratory Epidemiology. United Kingdom: European Respiratory Society, 2014.
 Blasi, Francesco B.. Lung Diseases: Chronic Respiratory Infections. Switzerland: MDPI AG, 2018.
 Bronchiectasis. United Kingdom: European Respiratory Society, 2018.
 Palange, Paolo., Rohde, Gernot. ERS Handbook of Respiratory Medicine. United Kingdom: European Respiratory Society, 2019.
 Vijayan, Vannan K., Jindal, Surinder K. World Clinics: Pulmonary & Critical Care Medicine - Chronic Obstructive Pulmonary Disease. India: Jaypee Brothers,Medical Publishers Pvt. Limited, 2013.
 Woodhead, Mark., Torres, Antoni., Mandell, Lionel., Ewig, Santiago. Respiratory Infections. United Kingdom: CRC Press, 2006.
 Menendez, Rosario. Community-Acquired Pneumonia: Strategies for Management. Germany: Wiley, 2008.
 Leeper, Kenneth V.. Severe Community Acquired Pneumonia. Germany: Springer US, 2013.
 Webb, Andrew. Oxford Textbook of Critical Care. United Kingdom: Oxford University Press, 2016.

References

External links 

 Francesco Blasi in Google Scholar
 Francesco Blasi in ResearchGate
 Francesco Blasi in Scopus

Italian pulmonologists
Living people
1959 births
University of Milan alumni
Academic staff of the University of Milan